Grover Clark (December 14, 1891 – July 17, 1938) was an American journalist and editor with expertise in Asian affairs.

Early life 
Clark was born in Osaka, Japan, to American missionaries, he was educated at Oberlin College (BA 1914), the University of Chicago (MA 1918) and Columbia University (PhD candidate, 1936).

Career 
Clark taught in Tokyo (1918–1920), then moved his base to Peking (Beijing, 1920–1930). He owned and edited the English language newspaper The Peking Leader.  He also was a columnist for several American magazines and newspapers, such as the Christian Science Monitor. He moved to New York where he became a prolific writer and speaker on Asian affairs, with a regular column in Current History. He was a lecturer at Columbia University, and after 1937 a professor of economics at the University of Denver. He was a leader in the China International Famine Relief Commission. His books emphasized that colonies almost never produced a profit, but were undertaken for prestige—for "a place in the sun."

One legal magazine reported in 1937: "Professor Clark is widely recognized as one of the leading authorities on the Far East. His knowledge of Far Eastern peoples and their problems is based on long personal contact....Professor Clark has been much in demand for lectures on Far Eastern affairs."

Death 
Clark died of a heart attack while leading a scholarly panel at the University of Virginia.

Publications
 Tibet, China, and Great Britain (Peking, 1924)
 "China in 1927" Chinese Social and Political Science Review, Vol. 12, Issue 1 (January 1928), pp. 136–196
 Economic Rivalries in China (Yale University Press, for Carnegie Endowment, 1932).
 "China's Economic Emergence." The Annals of the American Academy of Political and Social Science 168.1 (1933): 84-94.online
 "A Lull in China." Current History and Forum. Vol. 40. No. 6. 1934.
 "American Interests and Policy in the Far East" International Conciliation, Vol. 16, pp. 43–57 (1934)
 The Great Wall Crumbles (New York: The Macmillan Company. 1935. Pp. xvii, 406.) online
 The Balance Sheet of Imperialism: Facts and Figures on Colonies (Columbia University Press,  for Carnegie Endowment for International Peace, New York, 1936). online
 A Place in the Sun (The Macmillan Company, New York, 1936)
 "China, Japan and Ourselves in Perspective" Vital Speeches of the Day (Aug 15, 1937) Vol. 3 Issue 21, pp 669+.

Notes

External links
 short scholarly articles by Clark

1891 births
1938 deaths
American expatriates in China
American sinologists
Writers from Osaka
Oberlin College alumni
University of Chicago alumni
Columbia University alumni
Columbia University people
University of Denver faculty
American newspaper editors
The Christian Science Monitor people
Journalists from New York (state)
Writers from Tokyo
Writers from Beijing
20th-century American journalists
American male journalists
American expatriates in Japan